Kate Mackenzie (born 26 February 1967) is a British rower. She competed at the 1996 Summer Olympics and the 2000 Summer Olympics.

References

External links
 

1967 births
Living people
British female rowers
Olympic rowers of Great Britain
Rowers at the 1996 Summer Olympics
Rowers at the 2000 Summer Olympics
Rowers from Greater London